The Malgaru were an Aboriginal Australian people of Western Australia. They might have been a subgroup of the Wariangga.

Country
Their land took in the area running north from Gascoyne Junction north as far as the vicinity of Minnie Creek. They were also present at Eudamullah. Their southern extension ran close to Fossil Hill. Their neighbours on the western side of the Kennedy Range were the Maia. Top the northeast were the Ninanu, while directly east lay the Watjarri.

People
The Malgaru were one of the tribes that refrained from introducing circumcision into their rites of initiation.

Notes

Citations

Sources

Aboriginal peoples of Western Australia